The Paul Hall Center for Maritime Training and Education is a merchant marine educational facility in Piney Point, Maryland, which is affiliated with the Seafarers International Union.  Founded in 1967 in Brooklyn, New York as "The Seafarers' Harry Lundeberg School of Seamanship", the Paul Hall Center is the largest training facility for deep sea merchant seafarers and inland waterways boatmen in the United States.  The school was moved to the  plot at the confluence of the Potomac River and St. George's Creek at the Piney Point location in 1991, and at the same time renamed after former SIU president Paul Hall.

According to SIU, "Tens of thousands of rated and licensed seamen have completed upgrading classes at the training center. Additionally, more than 21,000 men and women from every state in the U.S., Puerto Rico and several U.S. territories have graduated from the trainee program for those just beginning their maritime careers."

The center features a number of buildings, including:
 The Joseph Sacco Fire Fighting and Safety School
 The Seafarers Harry Lundeberg School of Seamanship
 The Thomas B. Crowley Sr. Education Center
 The Paul Hall Library and Maritime Museum
 The Romeo Lupinacci Culinary lab

Prior to the opening of the Paul Hall Center, SIU maintained training facilities at five different ports. In 1966, the union bought the Piney Point site.

In 1978, SIU entered into an arrangement with Charles County Community College of Maryland which allows participants to earn an Associates of Arts degree.  In 1993, the Maryland Higher Education Commission authorized the college program to change its degree award to an Associate of Applied Science degree and to a certificate program in Maritime Technology.

Training programs 
Professional training begins with basic or entry-level vocational education programs. 
 Unlicensed Apprentice Program
 Deck Upgrading Courses
 Engine Department Upgrading Courses
 Steward Department Upgrading Courses
 Other Miscellaneous Courses
 Passenger Vessel Training
The upgrading programs provide experienced seafarers the opportunity to advance their professional skills.

NCL America 
In 2004, Norwegian Cruise Lines' NCL America division began operating the Pride of Aloha in Hawaii.  The cruise line was plagued by customer complaints which prompted them to seek out a training program for new employees. The Paul Hall Center was chosen as the location of NCL America's training facility until early 2007, when part of their training operations were moved to a facility at Barber's Point, HI.

See also

 Paul Hall (labor leader)
 Michael Sacco
 Harry Lundeberg
 Seafarers International Union
 MV Freedom Star

References

External links
 Paul Hall Center
 Seafarers International Union

Educational institutions established in 1967
Vocational education in the United States
Maritime education
1967 establishments in New York City
Transport education